Majeroni (pronounced mah-rony) is an Italian surname shared by:
Achille Majeroni (theatre) (1824–1888), Italian actor, brother of Eduardo
Achille Majeroni (1881–1964), Italian film actor, son of Achille
Eduardo Majeroni (1840–1891), Italian actor in Australia, brother of Achille
Mario Majeroni (1870-1931), Italian actor in Australia and America, son of Eduardo
George Majeroni (1877–1924), Australian actor in America, son of Eduardo